Orokaiva is a Papuan language spoken in the "tail" of Papua New Guinea.

Varieties
Orokaiva is spoken in 200 villages around Popondetta in Oro Province.

Hunjara is spoken in Kokoda Rural LLG of Oro Province.

Aeka is spoken in Tamata Rural LLG of Oro Province.

References

External links
Humotepain-Ari te Giu, Prayers and Offices in Orokaiva (1953) Digitized by Richard Mammana
 

Languages of Oro Province
Greater Binanderean languages